Streptomyces hyderabadensis is a bacterium species from the genus of Streptomyces which has been isolated from farm soil in Andhra Pradesh in India.

See also 
 List of Streptomyces species

References

Further reading

External links
Type strain of Streptomyces hyderabadensis at BacDive -  the Bacterial Diversity Metadatabase	

hyderabadensis
Bacteria described in 2011